The Women's Cross-Country event at the 2010 South American Games was held at 9:00 on March 23.

Medalists

Results
Race distance: 30 km (7 laps)

References
Report

Cross Country W
South